Do Androids Dream of Electric Beats? is an UNKLE soundscape DJ mix, originally recorded for Radio Ape in Japan, Do Androids Dream Of Electric Beats was the first in a line of a series of UNKLESounds mixes. Due to its huge success (reaching over £100 on eBay) it was bootlegged and can now be found in most record stores.

The name references the novel Do Androids Dream of Electric Sheep? by sci fi author Philip K. Dick. The mix was later released as a cut down and re-edited 2CD mix entitled Big Brother is Watching (a reference to another sci fi novel, George Orwell's Nineteen Eighty-Four), which was broadcast on the Essential Mix at UK radio station Radio 1.

Track listing

Disc One - Shin (55'35)
 "Intro" 1'23
 Rare Earth - "Get Ready" 2'05
 Unkle - "Lonely Soul" (UnkleSounds Edit) 6'36
 "Sounds Interlude #1" 0'40
 The Psychonauts - "Circles" 4'11
 Giorgio Moroder - "Tears" 2'13
 DJ Shadow - "Organ Donor" 1'30
 DJ Shadow - "Organ Donor" (Extended Overhaul) 3'03
 South - "Broken Head II" 3'26
 South - "Broken Head II" (Jagz Kooner Mix) 5'12
 Queens Of The Stone Age - "Feel Good Hit Of The Summer" 3'17
 Unkle - "Safe In Mind" 8'40
 Unkle - "Nursery Rhyme" (UnkleSounds Edit) 5'16
 Blur - "Battle" (Unkle Remix) 8'02

Disc Two  - Gi (74'00)

 "Intro" 0'07
 Red Hot Chili Peppers - "Breaking the Girl" 2'13
 Animated - "Grab the Rope" (FC Kahuna Mix) 1'17
 FC Kahuna - "Mindset To Cycle" 4'52
 Superfunk - "Last Dance (And I Come Over)" (Eric Morillo Dub) 3'44
 The Rolling Stones - "Sympathy For The Devil" (UnkleSounds Edit) 3'22
 Morel - "True (The Faggot Is You)" (FC Kahuna’s Headstart mMx) 3'22
 The Psychonauts - "Empty Love" 4'46
 Vangelis - "Blade Runner End Titles" (Unknown Mix) 3'32
 Iggy Pop - "Nightclubbing" 0'20
 Echomen - "Thru 2 You" (Bushwacka! Remix) 6'21
 Landmine - "Fairytale" 5'04
 Depeche Mode - "Dream On" (Bushwacka! Blunt Mix) 3'56
 Medway - "Release" 9'58
 Lazonby - "Sacred Cycles" (Medway Remix) 6'44
 Radiohead - "Everything In Its Right Place" (UnkleSounds Edit) 5'47
 Layo & Bushwacka! - "Love Story" 5'11
 Fleetwood Mac - "The Chain" 2'57
 "Outro" 0'26

Disc Three - Tai (74'00)

 "Intro" 0'15
 Tycoon To$h and The Terminator Troops - "Props Masters Party" 0'08
 John Williams - "Star Wars Theme (NES Version)" 0'59
 Skelf - "I Can't Comprehend" 5'34
 Peter Dildo - "Physical 2000" 3'47
 Unkle featuring Ian Brown - "Be There" (UnkleSounds Edit) 5'17
 Girls On Top - "I Wanna Dance With Numbers" (UnkleSounds Edit) 4'29
 Forme - "Kick A Hole" (Tigerstyle) 5'45
 Howie B. - "Hey Jack" (Unkle Metamorphosis Mix) 8'49
 The Beatles - "Tomorrow Never Knows" (UnkleSounds Edit) 5'26
 Unkle - "Eye For An Eye" (UnkleSounds Edit) 6'42
 Bushwacka! - "Feel It" 4'59
 Mercury Rev - "Holes" (Remix) 5'22
 Forme - "Percussive Thinking" 5'56
 Bushwacka! - "The Egyptian" 4'22
 "Sounds Interlude #2" 0'12
 Unkle - "Rabbit In Your Headlights" (UnkleSounds Edit) 6'01

References

Unkle albums
2001 compilation albums
DJ mix albums